James Fargie (30 October 1886 – 18 June 1960) was an Australian rules footballer who played with Melbourne in the Victorian Football League (VFL).

Family
The son of William McKenzie Fargie (c.1860-1941), and Rachel Fargie (1861-1947), née Whiteley, James Fargie was born in Collingwood, Victoria on 30 October 1886.

He married Adelaide Victoria Jean Teele (1887-1970) on 16 October 1913.

Notes

External links 

 Jim Fargie, at Demonwiki.

1886 births
1960 deaths
Australian rules footballers from Victoria (Australia)
Melbourne Football Club players